Uden or (usually) Van Uden is a Dutch toponymic surname meaning "(from/of) Uden", a town in North Brabant. Notable people with the surname include:

 (1912–2008), Dutch pedagogue and psychologist
Lucas van Uden (1595–1672), Flemish landscape painter, draughtsman and engraver
Martin Uden (born 1955), British diplomat
Roman Van Uden (born 1988), New Zealand cyclist

References

Dutch-language surnames
Toponymic surnames
Surnames of Dutch origin